Neuadd Wen A.F.C. are a Welsh football club from the town of Aberbargoed in the Welsh county borough of Caerphilly, within the historic boundaries of Monmouthshire, south Wales. Formed in 2009, they played for one season in the Welsh Football League . They currently play in the Gwent County League Division Two, tier 6 of the Welsh football pyramid.

Club history
The club was formed in 2009 from a group of players largely playing reserve team football for Welsh Football League club Aberbargoed Buds. The club started in North Gwent Football League hoping to get into the Gwent County League. They were Premier League champions in 2011–12. They moved up the Gwent League pyramid by finishing runners-up in Division Three and Division Two in successive seasons. The following season they completed a successive hat-trick of second places as runners-up in Division One, progressing to the Welsh Football League Division Three.  The club remained in the league for just one season, finishing bottom of the league in 16th place by one point. In July 2018 the club folded after relegation from the Welsh Football League.

In September 2019 a reformed version of the club entered the North Gwent Football League Premier Division.

The club were champions of the 2021–22 North Gwent Football League earning themselves promotion to the Gwent County League Division Two.

Honours

Gwent County League Division One – Runners-up: 2016–17
Gwent County League Division Two – Runners-up: 2015–16
Gwent County League Division Three – Runners-up: 2014–15
North Gwent Football League Premier Division – Champions: 2011–12
North Gwent Football League Premier Division – Champions: 2021–22
Gwent Senior Cup – Runners-up: 2016–17

Welsh Football League history
Information in this section is sourced from the Football Club History Database.

Notes

References

External links
Twitter

Football clubs in Wales
2009 establishments in Wales
Association football clubs established in 2009
Welsh Football League clubs
Gwent County League clubs